John Reginald Piggott  is an Australian economist.  He is the Director of the ARC Centre of Excellence in Population Ageing Research (CEPAR) at the University of New South Wales, Australia, where he is Scientia Professor of Economics. He is a Fellow of the Academy of the Social Sciences in Australia.

Education and career 
John Piggott graduated with a PhD in Economics from the University of London. He has held continuous full-time academic appointments since graduation. He is Director of the ARC Centre of Excellence in Population Ageing Research (CEPAR) and Scientia Professor of Economics at the University of New South Wales, Australia.

In 2011, he was awarded a UNSW Scientia Professorship in recognition of his international research stature. In that same year he was awarded an Australian Research Council (ARC) Professorial Fellowship and began his term as the Director of CEPAR. He holds Research Fellowships with both CESifo and IZA Institute of Labor Economics. He holds an on-going Visiting Professor position at Zhejiang University, and was Visiting Scholar with the Wharton School of the University of Pennsylvania from 2008-2010.

He has held a range of academic management positions at UNSW Sydney, including two terms as Head of the School of Economics, and seven years as Associate Dean Research.

His Australian policy experience includes membership of both the Henry Tax Review Panel and the Ministerial Superannuation Advisory Committee. Internationally, he worked for nearly a decade with the Japanese Government on pension and ageing issues. John Piggott has been a consultant to several foreign governments on pension issues, including Russia and Indonesia.

In 2018/2019, John Piggott was appointed as a cochair of the Think20 (T20) Task Force on Aging Population during Japan’s G20 Presidency, helping G20 nations decide how they will cope with ageing populations.

Research contributions 
John Piggott has a long-standing interest in the economics of population ageing, retirement and pension economics and finance. His publications include more than 100 journal articles and chapters in books.

He has also co-authored two books, Forced Saving and UK Tax Policy and Applied General Equilibrium Analysis, both published by Cambridge University Press. In 2016 and 2018, he co-edited three volumes on ageing: Elsevier’s Handbook of the Economics of Population Ageing, Population Ageing and Australia’s Future, published by the Academy of Social Sciences in Australia (ASSA) and ANU Press, and The Taxation of Pensions, published by MIT Press.

He serves as book review editor of the Cambridge journal, the Journal of Pension Economics and Finance, as an Associate Editor of the Journal of the Economics of Aging, and has been appointed to the editorial board of the Journal of Retirement.

Awards and honours 

 Fellow of the Academy of Social Sciences in Australia (FASSA) (1992)
 ARC Australian Professorial Fellow (2011-2015)
 UNSW Scientia Professorship (2011)
Officer of the Order of Australia (2020)

References

External links 
 Website of CEPAR: cepar.edu.au
 Researcher profile at UNSW Sydney

Year of birth missing (living people)
Living people
Fellows of the Academy of the Social Sciences in Australia
Australian economists
Academic staff of the University of New South Wales
Officers of the Order of Australia